Shivyar may refer to:
 Shivyar, Charuymaq
 Shivyar, Meyaneh